Rebecca Ghilardi (born 10 October 1999) is an Italian pair skater. With her skating partner, Filippo Ambrosini, she is the 2023 European silver medalist, 2022 Grand Prix of Espoo champion, a five-time ISU Challenger Series medalist, and a five-time Italian national silver medalist (2019-2023). The pair represented Italy at the 2022 Winter Olympics.

Career

Early years 
Ghilardi began learning to skate in 2007. Competing in ladies' singles, she became the Italian novice silver medalist in March 2013 and took the junior silver medal in December. She was coached by Tiziana Rosaspina.

Ghilardi last appeared in ladies' singles in December 2015. In 2016, she teamed up with Filippo Ambrosini to compete in pair skating.

2016–2017 season 
Making their international debut, Ghilardi/Ambrosini won the bronze medal at the 2016 CS Lombardia Trophy in September. They took bronze at the International Cup of Nice a month later. In December, they became the Italian national bronze medalists. They placed 14th in the short program, 11th in the free skate and 11th overall at the 2017 European Championships, which took place in January in Ostrava, Czech Republic. They trained under Rosanna Murante and Tiziana Rosaspina in Bergamo.

2017–2018 season 
Ghilardi/Ambrosini placed 8th at the 2017 CS Warsaw Cup in November. The following month, they repeated as national bronze medalists. They won silver at the Toruń Cup in January and bronze at the International Challenge Cup in February.

2018–2019 season 
Ghilardi/Ambrosini competed at several Challenger events at the beginning of the season, including taking the silver medal at the 2018 CS Inge Solar Memorial.  They won the silver medal as well as the Italian Championships and were sent to the 2018 European Championships, where they finished in ninth place.  At their first World Championships, they finished nineteenth among the nineteen competitors.

2019–2020 season 
Ghilardi/Ambrosini made their Grand Prix debut at the 2019 Internationaux de France, where they placed eighth.  They then placed seventh at the 2019 Rostelecom Cup.  After taking silver at the Italian Championships, they finished the season at the 2020 European Championships, placing eighth. They had been assigned to compete at the World Championships in Montreal, but these were cancelled as a result of the coronavirus pandemic.

2020–2021 season
With the pandemic continuing to affect events, Ghilardi/Ambrossini started their season off at the 2020 CS Nebelhorn Trophy, which was only attended by pairs teams training in Europe. They were third after the short program, and after the withdrawal of Hase/Seegert, the leaders after that segment, they narrowly won their first Challenger Series title over silver medalists Hocke/Kunkel.  They were scheduled to compete on the Grand Prix at the 2020 Internationaux de France, but the event was cancelled due to the pandemic.

They placed seventeenth at the 2021 World Championships in Stockholm.

2021–2022 season
Ghilardi/Ambrosini began the season at the 2021 CS Lombardia Trophy, winning the bronze medal. They had initially been assigned to compete on the Grand Prix at the 2021 Cup of China, but following the event's cancellation, they were reassigned to a special home 2021 Gran Premio d'Italia, held in Turin. They placed fifth. They were fifth as well at their second Grand Prix, the 2021 Internationaux de France. They placed fourth at the Budapest Trophy.

At the Italian championships, Ghilardi/Ambrosini won the silver medal. Later, they were named to their first Olympic team. Competing first at the 2022 European Championships, Ghilardi/Ambrosini placed fourth in the short program. They were fifth in the free skate and dropped to fifth overall. Ghilardi said it was an emotional moment for them to have made the final group of the free skate alongside the elite Russian teams.

Competing at the 2022 Winter Olympics in the pairs event, Ghilardi/Ambrosini placed sixteenth in the short program after Ghilardi fell twice, one of those being on her triple Salchow attempt. They were the final team to qualify for the free skate. They moved up to fourteenth overall in the free. The team was scheduled to finish the season at the 2022 World Championships, but withdrew after Ghilardi tested positive for COVID.

2022–2023 season
Ghilardi/Ambrosini won gold at the 2022 CS U.S. Classic in their first major competition of the season and their second ever Challenger title. On the Grand Prix, they placed fourth at the 2022 Grand Prix de France, 5.01 points back of bronze medalists Hocke/Kunkel. Despite missing the podium at their first event, they remained in contention to make the Grand Prix Final heading into their second, the 2022 Grand Prix of Espoo. In a relatively weak field, Ghilardi/Ambrosini set a new personal best in the short program (67.31), leading that segment by over four points. They won the free skate as well, setting a new personal best in total score (189.74), and taking the gold medal over Germans Efimova/Blommaert by almost twenty points. This was the first Grand Prix win for an Italian pair since 2013, and qualified them to the Grand Prix Final, to be held on home ice in Torino. They finished fifth at the Final.

After winning their fifth consecutive national silver medal, Ghilardi/Ambrosini competed at the 2023 European Championships in Espoo. With Russian pairs banned from competing due to the Russo-Ukrainian War, the podium at the European Championships was considered far more open than in recent seasons. Ghilardi and Ambrosini both made errors in the short program, finishing fifth in that segment. They went on to win the free skate, rising to second overall. With their compatriots, Italian national champions Conti/Macii, taking the gold medal in an historic first for their country, Italian pairs had the top two places on the podium. These were only the second and third pairs medals for Italian teams in the nearly century-old European pairs competition.

Programs 
(with Ambrosini)

Competitive highlights 
GP: Grand Prix; CS: Challenger Series

Pairs with Ambrosini

Ladies' singles

References

External links 
 

1999 births
Italian female pair skaters
Living people
People from Seriate
Figure skaters at the 2022 Winter Olympics
Olympic figure skaters of Italy
Sportspeople from the Province of Bergamo